Ilyas Suleimenov (born 21 December 1990, Yegindykol, Aqmola) is a Kazakhstani boxer. At the 2012 Summer Olympics, he competed in the Men's flyweight, but was defeated in the first round.

References

Living people
Olympic boxers of Kazakhstan
Boxers at the 2012 Summer Olympics
Flyweight boxers
Asian Games medalists in boxing
Boxers at the 2014 Asian Games
Kazakhstani male boxers
Asian Games gold medalists for Kazakhstan
Medalists at the 2014 Asian Games

1990 births
People from Akmola Region
21st-century Kazakhstani people